Eupithecia consors is a moth in the  family Geometridae. It is found in Mexico.

References

Moths described in 1900
consors
Moths of Central America